Gadsden Depot is a United States military depot for storage of industrial materials in the city of Gadsden, Alabama.  The facility was known as Gadsden Air Force Station until deactivation in 1961.  During World War II, it was referred to as Army Air Force Specialized Depot #829.  The facility is now an industrial park used by various firms. One side is also adjacent to the city of Glencoe.

References

Installations of the United States Air Force in Alabama
Buildings and structures in Gadsden, Alabama
Military installations closed in 1961
Defense National Stockpile Center facilities